Hexarthrius  is a genus of large stag beetles. They are also known as fork horned stag beetles for the shape for their mandibles It includes the following species:

Hexarthrius aduncus Jordan & Rothschild, 1894 
Hexarthrius andreasi Schenk, 2003
Hexarthrius bowringii Parry, 1862
Hexarthrius buquettii (Hope, 1843)
Hexarthrius davisoni Waterhouse, 1888
Hexarthrius forsteri (Hope, 1840)
Hexarthrius howdeni De Lisle, 1972
Hexarthrius kirchneri Schenk, 2003
Hexarthrius mandibularis Deyrolle, 1881
Hexarthrius melchioritis Séguy, 1954  
Hexarthrius mniszechi (Thomson, 1857)
Hexarthrius nigritus Lacroix, 1990
Hexarthrius parryi Hope, 1842
Hexarthrius rhinoceros (Olivier, 1789)
Hexarthrius vitalisi Didier, 1925

See also

Taxonomy of Lucanidae

References

External links
Le Lucanidae du Monde: Hexarthrius picture gallery

Lucaninae
Lucanidae genera